Serrataginella is a genus of sea snails, marine gastropod mollusks in the family Marginellidae, the margin snails.

Serrataginella is now a synonym of Serrata.

Species
Species within the genus Serrataginella used to include:
 Serrataginella beatrix Cossignani, 2001: synonym of Serrata beatrix (T. Cossignani, 2001) (original combination)
 Serrataginella boussoufae Bozzetti & Briano, 2008: synonym of Serrata boussoufae (Bozzetti & Briano, 2008)
 Serrataginella brianoi(Bozzetti, 1994): synonym of Serrata brianoi Bozzetti, 1994
 Serrataginella isabelae Bozzetti, 2005: synonym of Serrata isabelae (Bozzetti, 2005) (original combination)
 Serrataginella spryi (Clover, 1974): synonym of Serrata spryi (Clover, 1974)

References

 Cossignani T. (2006). Marginellidae & Cystiscidae of the World. L'Informatore Piceno. 408pp.
 Boyer, F. (2008). The genus Serrata Jousseaume, 1875 (Caenogastropoda: Marginellidae) in New Caledonia. in: Héros, V. et al. (Ed.) Tropical Deep-Sea Benthos 25. Mémoires du Muséum national d'Histoire naturelle (1993). 196: 389-436

External links
 Coovert, G. A.; Coovert, H. K. (1995). Revision of the supraspecific classification of marginelliform gastropods. The Nautilus. 109(2-3): 43-100

Marginellidae